Regina Rene King (born January 15, 1971) is an American actress and director. She has received various accolades, including an Academy Award, a Golden Globe Award, and four Primetime Emmy Awards. In 2019, Time magazine named her one of the 100 most influential people in the world.

King first gained attention for playing Brenda Jenkins in the television series 227  (1985–1990). Her subsequent roles included the film Friday (1995), the animated series The Boondocks (2005–2014), and the crime television series Southland (2009–2013). She received four Primetime Emmy Awards for her roles in the ABC anthology series American Crime (2015–2017), the Netflix miniseries Seven Seconds, and the HBO limited series Watchmen (2019). Her other television roles include the drama series The Leftovers (2015–2017) and the sitcom The Big Bang Theory (2013–2019).

She became known for her memorable supporting roles in the drama films Boyz n the Hood (1991), Poetic Justice (1993), Jerry Maguire (1996), How Stella Got Her Groove Back (1998), and Ray (2004), as well as in the comedies Legally Blonde 2: Red, White & Blonde (2003), A Cinderella Story (2004), and Miss Congeniality 2: Armed & Fabulous (2005). She earned critical acclaim for her performance in Barry Jenkins's film adaptation of the James Baldwin novel If Beale Street Could Talk (2018), earning the Academy Award and Golden Globe Award for Best Supporting Actress. She has since starred in the western The Harder They Fall (2021)

King has directed episodes for several television shows, including Scandal in 2015 and 2016 and This Is Us in 2017. She has also directed the music video for the 2010 song "Finding My Way Back" by Jaheim. Her feature film directorial debut came with the drama One Night in Miami... (2020), for which she was nominated for a Golden Globe Award for Best Director and a Directors Guild of America Award for First Time Feature Film. She became the second black woman to be nominated for a Golden Globe Award for Best Director.

Early life and education
King was born in Los Angeles County, California, and grew up in View Park–Windsor Hills. She is the elder daughter of Gloria Jean ( Cain), a special education teacher, and Thomas Henry King Jr., an electrician. King's parents divorced in 1979. Her younger sister is former actress Reina King, who appeared on What's Happening Now!!

King attended Westchester High School, graduating in 1988. She later studied Communications at the University of Southern California, dropping out after two years when she realized her passion for acting.

Career

1985–2004: Early roles and breakthrough 
King began her acting career in 1985, playing the role of Brenda Jenkins on the television series 227, a role she played until the show ended in 1990. She went on to appear in the John Singleton films Boyz n the Hood, Poetic Justice, and Higher Learning. In 1995, she was featured in the hit comedy film Friday. The next year, she starred in the Martin Lawrence dark comedy-romance A Thin Line Between Love and Hate as Mia, and she gained fame starring in blockbuster romantic comedy film Jerry Maguire as Marcee Tidwell.

In 1998, she was cast in Tony Scott's film Enemy of the State, receiving her first nomination at the NAACP Image Awards for Outstanding Actress in a Motion Picture. In the same year, King took part in the films How Stella Got Her Groove Back, Mighty Joe Young, and Love and Action in Chicago. In 2001, King played Sontee Jenkins in Chris and Paul Weitz's Down to Earth, receiving praise from critics for her performance. The following year, she played the main role in television series Leap of Faith.

After taking part in teen romantic comedy film A Cinderella Story, King was cast as Margie Hendrix in the Academy Awards nominated biographical film Ray, about Ray Charles. For her performance in Ray, King won the Satellite Award for Best Supporting Actress, the NAACP Image Award for Outstanding Supporting Actress and was part of a cast nomination from the Screen Actors Guild Awards.

2005–2017: Established actress 

In 2005, King was cast in Miss Congeniality 2: Armed and Fabulous and began voicing the characters Huey and Riley Freeman for the animated series The Boondocks. In 2007, King played the main role of Sandra Palmer in season six of television series 24 and acted in films Year of the Dog and This Christmas. From 2009 to 2013, King played Detective Lydia Adams in TNT police drama Southland, receiving multiple Critics' Choice Television Award nominations, and winning two NAACP Image Awards.

After taking part in Rick Famuyiwa's romantic comedy film Our Family Wedding, King appeared as guest judge in RuPaul's Drag Race. In 2013, King played Caltech HR manager Janine Davis in the television series The Big Bang Theory. In 2014, she was cast in two television series, The Strain and Shameless.

In 2015, King was a cast member on ABC's John Ridley-penned ensemble drama American Crime, playing three roles, including a devout member of the Nation of Islam and the sister of a drug addict accused of murder. In 2015 and 2016, King won the Primetime Emmy Award for Outstanding Supporting Actress in a Limited Series or a Movie for her roles. Also in 2015, King starred in The Leftovers, which earned her a Peabody Award.

From 2015 to 2017, King began to pursue work as a director and writer, initially directing six episodes of the drama series Being Mary Jane. In 2016, she directed two episodes of Scandal, and single episodes of The Catch, Animal Kingdom, This Is Us and Shameless.

2018–present: Awards success and directorial debut 
In 2018, King played the mother of a murdered black teenager in the Netflix original series Seven Seconds, winning her third Primetime Emmy Award. Her performance in the 2018 film If Beale Street Could Talk, directed by Barry Jenkins, garnered critical acclaim and earned her the Golden Globe Award and Academy Award for Best Supporting Actress. King additionally won the Critics' Choice, Los Angeles Film Critics, New York Film Critics, National Society of Film Critics, and numerous other critic awards for Supporting Actress, making her the most awarded actor of 2018 in film. In regards to King's performance, Richard Roeper for the Chicago Sun-Times wrote: "Regina King is blazingly good in a nomination-worthy performance as Tish’s mother. Even when there’s fire in her eyes as she defends her daughter, you can see her primary motivating force is love. The love she has for her child, and for the child of her child." In his review for The Observer, Mark Kermode wrote: "As for Regina King, her brilliantly modulated performance is a masterclass in physical understatement. One moment stands out [...] 'Mamma… ,' says Tish, tentatively, and even before she turns to face us, an almost imperceptible movement of King’s neck and shoulders tells us that Sharon knows exactly what her daughter is about to say."

Re-teaming with The Leftovers creator Damon Lindelof, King starred in the 2019 limited series Watchmen, for which she received acclaim and won the TCA Award for Individual Achievement in Drama, Critics' Choice Award for Best Actress in a Drama Series, and her fourth Primetime Emmy Award. In an IndieWire review for the series, Ben Travers wrote: "King is nothing short of amazing — yes, she’s got an Oscar and three Emmys, but she puts even more range on display in a turn that effortlessly pivots between invulnerable and vulnerable." In a decade-end list by Caroline Framke and Daniel D'Addario for Variety, King's performance was amongst the best of the 2010s in television. In July 2019, it was announced King would direct One Night in Miami... based upon the play of the same name. The film had its world premiere at the Venice Film Festival on September 7, 2020, the first film directed by an African-American woman to be selected in the festival's history. King received numerous awards and nominations at major critics' prizes, earning a Best Director nomination at the Golden Globe Awards and being recognized with the Robert Altman Award at the Independent Spirit Awards.

In October 2021, King starred in Netflix's American Western film The Harder They Fall, directed by Jeymes Samuel, winning several awards including the NAACP Image Award for Outstanding Supporting Actress in a Motion Picture.

King will next produce and star in Netflix's Shirley, a biopic about the first black congresswoman Shirley Chisholm during her historic presidential campaign to be directed by John Ridley, with whom King previously worked on American Crime. In May 2021, it was announced that King would direct race-themed monster movie Bitter Root for Legendary Entertainment. King will executive produce and direct the David E. Kelley-written tv series A Man in Full for Netflix, based on the Tom Wolfe novel of the same name.

Personal life
King was married to Ian Alexander Sr. from 1997 to 2007. Their son, Ian Alexander Jr., who was born in 1996 and later became a disc jockey and recording artist, died by suicide on January 21, 2022, at age 26.

Filmography

Film

Television

As director

As music video director

References

External links

 King, Regina. "The Emmys: As White As Ever", The Huffington Post, September 3, 2010; retrieved October 9, 2010.

|-
! colspan="3" style="background:#DAA520;" | BET Award
|-

|-
! colspan="3" style="background:#DAA520;" | NAACP Image Award
|-

! colspan="3" style="background:#DAA520;" | Satellite Award
|-

1971 births
20th-century African-American people
20th-century African-American women
20th-century American actresses
21st-century African-American people
21st-century African-American women
21st-century American actresses
Actresses from Cincinnati
Actresses from Los Angeles
African-American actresses
African-American film directors
American child actresses
American film actresses
American television actresses
American television directors
American voice actresses
American women television directors
Audiobook narrators
Best Supporting Actress Academy Award winners
Best Supporting Actress Golden Globe (film) winners
Film directors from Los Angeles
Independent Spirit Award for Best Supporting Female winners
Living people
Outstanding Performance by a Lead Actress in a Miniseries or Movie Primetime Emmy Award winners
Outstanding Performance by a Supporting Actress in a Miniseries or Movie Primetime Emmy Award winners
People from View Park–Windsor Hills, California
University of Southern California alumni